Horama pennipes is a moth in the subfamily Arctiinae first described by Augustus Radcliffe Grote in 1866. It is found on Cuba.

The wingspan is about 26 mm. The forewings are fuscous black with a streak through the middle of the cell. The hindwings are fuscous black with a faint streak below the cell. The costal margin is gray.

References

Moths described in 1866
Euchromiina
Endemic fauna of Cuba